Peter Smith (May 26, 1877 – May 21, 1934) was a Canadian politician. He served as a Member of the Legislative Assembly of Ontario for Perth South from 1919 to 1923 representing the United Farmers of Ontario.

He served as provincial treasurer from 1919 to 1923. He was treasurer during the Ontario Bond Scandal.

Smith was tried for his role in the scandal following the fall of the UFO government. On October 24, 1924, he was found guilty of conspiracy to defraud the government and sentenced to three years. He and Aemilius Jarvis (sentenced to six months on the same conviction) were jointly fined $600,000. He died in 1934.

References

External links
 

1877 births
1934 deaths
Finance ministers of Ontario
United Farmers of Ontario MLAs